Woman's World is an American supermarket weekly magazine with a circulation of 1.6 million readers. Printed on paper generally associated with tabloid publications and priced accordingly, it concentrates on short articles about subjects such as weight loss, relationship advice and cooking, along with feature stories about women in the STEM fields and academia. It has held the title of the most popular newsstand women's magazine, with sales of 77 million copies in 2004. It competes with more general-market traditional magazines such as Woman's Day and the now-defunct Family Circle.

History
The magazine was launched in the United States in 1981 by a European magazine publisher, Heinrich Bauer Verlag of Hamburg, Germany, which set up an American subsidiary, Heinrich Bauer North America in Englewood Cliffs, New Jersey. Woman's World was the company's first American release, and was aimed at a target audience of middle-class mothers.  The magazine gained rapid popularity, and within ten years had a circulation of 1.5 million readers, generating $15 million USD in annual revenue.

A different magazine with the same name, but with no connection to the current one, was published in the United States 1884-1940. It has no connection to a local television series of the same name aired on WKRG-TV in Mobile, Alabama.

Format
The magazine is published in a large tabloid newspaper format, with about 60 pages per issue, and approximately 12% of the magazine devoted to advertisements. The cover generally features several headlines for internal articles, along with a cover model who is generally a regular woman rather than an actress or model, who has accomplished something such as a popular or winning recipe, written an article about a health story or exercise regimen for the magazine, or detailed their successful weight loss regimen. Celebrities (generally in niche fields such as soap operas or cable channel drama series on niche networks rather than higher-profile actresses) are also featured occasionally. The magazine generally does not publish gossip features.

Subject coverage
According to a profile at magsdirect.com, the content in the magazine as of 2003 broke down into the following categories:

 Features: 32%
 Food and Nutrition: 22%
 Health: 16%
 Home and Gardening: 9%
 Beauty and Grooming: 8%
 Travel: 5%
 Fashion: 4%
 Parenting: 4%

Readership

According to magsdirect.com:

 Women: 95%
 Men: 5%
 Median age: 46
 Median household income: $50,192
 Employed: 66%
 Employed full-time: 51%
 Working mother: 32%
 Married: 60%
 Children in household: 47%
 Average age of children: 9.5

References

 "Local woman featured on front of Woman's World magazine", August 25, 2006, The Californian
 "#410, Heinz Bauer", Forbes profile of Woman's World's billionaire publisher
 Bauer publishing history
http://winit.womansworldmag.com/ Magazine website.
 "New German Entry in Women's Magazines", January 21, 1981, New York Times

Magazines established in 1981
Supermarket tabloids
Women's magazines published in the United States
Bauer Media Group
Weekly magazines published in the United States
1981 establishments in New Jersey
Magazines published in New Jersey